Track 5 is an Australian urban music act based in Melbourne, Australia.

Band history
Track 5 was formed in 2001 by Krishool, Adam Lovell or Adz and Paul Vercoe or Verx. Krishool was born in Ghana and joined the Australian Boys Choir after his family moved to Australia - he also auditioned for Popstars but was unsuccessful. Adam Lovell was born in Brisbane and comes from a background in circus and theater while Paul Vercoe was born in rural Victoria and has classical training in piano and choirs. While the band originally had five members, the other two members of the band didn't stay around long.

Track 5 built up their reputation through live performances around Australia. They won a Philips Five Minutes competition in 2002 and recorded a track "Not the One" which didn't chart. They signed with Depac Music in early 2004. Producers Paul Carmody and Steuart De Hoedt produced their debut single on that label "Crazy". Released in June 2004, it made the top 50 of the Australian singles charts in July 2004.

In 2005 to raise money for a trip to Berlin's PopKomm festival they put themselves on EBay, getting no takers for their self-priced starting bid.

Band members
Krishool
Adam Lovell or Adz
Paul Vercoe or Verx

Discography

Singles

References

External links
Track 5 web site

Victoria (Australia) musical groups